
Gmina Będków is a rural gmina (administrative district) in Tomaszów Mazowiecki County, Łódź Voivodeship, in central Poland.

Villages
Gmina Będków contains the villages and settlements of Będków, Brzóstów, Ceniawy, Drzazgowa Wola, Ewcin, Gutków, Kalinów, Łaknarz, Magdalenka, Nowiny, Prażki, Remiszewice, Rosocha, Rudnik, Rzeczków, Sługocice, Teodorów, Wykno and Zacharz.

Neighbouring gminas
Gmina Będków is bordered by the gminas of Brójce, Czarnocin, Moszczenica, Rokiciny, Ujazd and Wolbórz.

References
 Polish official population figures 2006

External links
 The old website (archived)

Bedkow
Tomaszów Mazowiecki County